Amanda Grahame (born 25 March 1979) is a former professional tennis player from Australia.

Biography
Grahame was born in Canberra, one of four daughters of stockbroker Denis and maths teacher Jeanette. Coached by Chris Kachel, Grahame began competing on the professional tour in 1997. She won three ITF Circuit singles titles locally in 1998 as well as the doubles at the $25,000 Lexington event. In 1999 she made the second round of the Australian Open doubles with Bryanne Stewart and played in the main doubles draw of the French Open. At the 2000 Australian Open she competed in the singles draw for the first of three times and lost a close opening round match to Serena Williams. She led the American 4–2 in the first set which she lost, then claimed the second set, but went down 4–6 in the third. Her best performances on the WTA Tour were at the Canberra International. She made the doubles quarter-finals in 2001 with Justine Henin and was a singles semi-finalist as a qualifier in 2002, with wins over Barbara Rittner, Rachel McQuillan and Petra Mandula.

ITF finals

Singles (3–6)

Doubles (3–10)

References

External links
 
 

1979 births
Living people
Australian female tennis players
Tennis people from the Australian Capital Territory